The Aladaglar are a mountain range in Turkey. They harbour the highest peaks of the eastern Taurus mountains. The Aladaglar are stretched across the provinces of Nigde, Adana and Kayseri and are important areas for mountaineering and rock climbing. The highest peak of the mountain range is Kızılkaya (3771m). 

This mountain range stretches over a 25 km wide and 40 km long area. This mountain range has more than 60 peaks that are over 3000 m high. All of these peaks offer classical ascent routes alongside routes that offer technical climbing. These peaks offer over 170 traditional climbing routes. 

Aladağlar National Park (Turkish: Aladağlar Milli Parkı), established on April 21, 1995, is a national park in southern Turkey. It got its name ''Ala-Daglar'' (Crimson-Mountains) because of the color of the rusty hills that are most noticeable at sunset. The national park, a mountain range of the Anti-Taurus Mountains (Turkish: Aladağlar), stretches over the locations Yahyalı in Kayseri Province, Çamardı in Niğde Province and Aladağ in Adana Province.

Mountains of Turkey